A cell survival curve is a curve used in radiobiology. It depicts the relationship between the fraction of cells retaining their reproductive integrity and the absorbed dose of radiation.  Conventionally, the surviving fraction is depicted on a logarithmic scale, and is plotted on the y-axis against dose on the x-axis.

The linear quadratic model is now most often used to describe the cell survival curve, assuming that there are two mechanisms to cell death by radiation: A single lethal event or an accumulation of harmful but non-lethal events. Cell survival fractions are exponential functions with a dose-dependent term in the exponent due to the Poisson statistics underlying the stochastic process. Whereas single lethal events lead to an exponent that is linearly related to dose, the survival fraction function for a two-stage mechanism carries an exponent proportional to the square of dose. The coefficients must be inferred from measured data, such as the Hiroshima Leukemia data. With higher orders being of lesser importance and the total survival fraction being the product of the two functions, the model is aptly called linear-quadratic.

See also
Dose fractionation
Dose–response relationship
Chronic radiation syndrome

External links

Curves
Radiobiology